Cabaret is a commune in the Arcahaie Arrondissement, in the Ouest department of Haiti. In 2009, the commune had 62,063 inhabitants. During his dictatorship, François Duvalier renamed it Duvalierville; in 1961 a construction project was begun. Construction eventually stopped, but the name was kept until Duvalier's successor, his son Jean-Claude Duvalier, fled the country in 1986.

Settlements

References

Populated places in Ouest (department)
Communes of Haiti